Mona Punjab (Urdu مونہ پنجاب) is a village, union council, and administrative subdivision of Sargodha District (Urdu ضِلع سرگودها) in the Punjab Province of Pakistan. It is part of Bhalwal Tehsil.

References 

Sargodha District